Stephen Cook is a computer scientist.

Stephen Cook may also refer to:
Stephen Cook (cricketer) (born 1982), cricketer
Stephen Lloyd Cook, Old Testament scholar and professor

See also
Stephen Cooke (born 1983), British footballer
Steven Cook, British artist, photographer, and graphic designer.
Steve Cook (disambiguation)
Jimmy Cook (Stephen James Cook, born 1953), South African sportsperson